Avril Percy Williams (born 10 February 1961 in Paarl) is a former rugby union wing who was the second coloured man (after Errol Tobias) to play for South Africa. His nephew Chester Williams later played for the Springboks too.

Playing career
Williams played for Western Province in the South African provincial competitions. He gained two caps for the Springboks in June 1984, both against England. His test debut was on 2 June 1984 at the Boet Erasmus Stadium in Port Elizabeth.

Test history

See also
List of South Africa national rugby union players – Springbok no. 533

References

1961 births
Living people
Sportspeople from Paarl
Cape Coloureds
South African rugby union players
South Africa international rugby union players
Western Province (rugby union) players
Rugby union players from the Western Cape
Rugby union centres
Rugby union wings